The Greenbelt–Twinbrook Line, designated Route C2 or C4, are daily bus routes operated by the Washington Metropolitan Area Transit Authority between Greenbelt station (C2) or Hyattsville Crossing station (C4) of the Green and Yellow Lines and Wheaton station (C2) or Twinbrook station (C4) of the Red Line of the Washington Metro. Both lines operate every 15 – 20 minutes during peak hours, 12 – 24 minutes weekdays and Saturdays, while the C2 runs every 45 – 55 minutes on Sundays and the C4 runs every 12 minutes on Sundays and 30 minutes late nights daily. Trips would take roughly 60 – 70 minutes for both routes. On Sundays however, the C2 is shortened to operate between Takoma Langley Crossroads Transit Center and Greenbelt Station, which takes 30 minutes. Both lines connect northern Prince George's County to Montgomery County via the University Boulevard East/West (MD 193) corridor.

Background
Routes C2 and C4 mostly provide service along University Boulevard operating between Montgomery County and Prince George's County via Takoma Park connecting riders between the two. Routes C2 and C4 get their buses out of Montgomery division.

C2 stops

C4 stops

History
C2 was created as a new route on February 4, 1973, to replace the segment of the former J8 streetcar line between Wheaton Plaza & Montgomery Mall when the J8 became a Metrobus Route and was truncated to only operate between the Wheaton Plaza & Beltway Plaza. Routes C2 & J8 operated as part of the "Beltway Plaza–Montgomery Mall Line" until February 19, 1978. when they were both merged into route C2. Route C2 operated between Montgomery Mall & Beltway Plaza, via Prince George's Plaza Mall & University of Maryland, College Park.

Route C4 was originally designated as the Randolph Road Line. It operated between White Oak and Montgomery College until September 6, 1981, when it was replaced by extended Metrobus route Z4.

On January 27, 1985, route C2 was rerouted to terminate at the newly opened Twinbrook station, discontinuing service to Montgomery Mall. The portion of the route between Wheaton station and Montgomery Mall would be replaced by Ride On route 35. As a result of this change, the line would be renamed the "Beltway Plaza-Twinbrook Line". 

On September 22, 1990, route C2 was truncated to only operate up to Wheaton station. The C4 would begin revenue service at the same time, operating between Langley Park and Twinbrook station. Route C2 would now only operate between Wheaton station and Beltway Plaza.

On December 11, 1993, route C2 was extended from Beltway Plaza Mall to Greenbelt Center via Greenbelt station when the Green Line northern portion was opened replacing route F6 service between University Of Maryland and Beltway Plaza which was rerouted to serve New Carrollton station along with route F4. But Route C2 will discontinue service via Prince Georges Plaza, and would operate through the University Of Maryland operating on a direct route along Campus Drive.

Route C4 was extended from Langley Park to Prince George's Plaza station, along route C2's original routing from intersection of University Boulevard East in Langley Park & the Prince George's Plaza Mall, via Riggs Road, and East West Highway. The line was renamed as the "Greenbelt-Twinbrook Line" as result of these changes.

On January 13, 2001, route C4 was rerouted along Toledo Terrace and Belcrest Road to serve the apartment complexes behind The Mall at Prince Georges. The line would serve the mall bus bays from Belcrest Road.

On May 15, 2003, the original bus bays inside Prince Georges Plaza mall, were demolished in order to build a new Target store. Routes C4 along with routes 86, F4, F6, F8, R2, R3, R4 and TheBus 13, 14, 18 have stopped entering and looping inside around the mall.

In 2010, WMATA proposed to completely discontinue the C4 and to replace it with the C8 and J5. Under the proposal, the J5 would discontinue service along the Capital Beltway and Grosvenor–Strathmore station and will serve the former C4 stops via Parklawn Drive, Randolph Road, Veirs Mill Road, Wheaton Station, and Georgia Avenue. Service to Prince George's Plaza station would be provided by the C8 which was proposed to discontinue service to College Park–University of Maryland station and University of Maryland. However a major problem in the proposal was the C8 was proposed to only operate on Weekday Peak Hour services only while the J5 only operated during Peak Hours. With the discontinuation of the C4 and the changes made on the C8 and J5, it would not only lose direct service from Prince George's Plaza to Twinbrook, it would also mean residents would have a lack of bus service where the C4 operated since the C8 and J5 would only operate during rush hours only.

Route C2 was proposed to be shorten to Greenbelt station discontinuing service to Greenbelt Center being replaced by a new route T12, T14, and existing T16 or routes G12, G14, and G16 eliminating service between Greenbelt station and Greenbelt Center. This was a result of Greenbelt bus service lacking much service and the city of Greenbelt wanting to restructure the lines.

On December 19, 2010, route C2 was truncated from the Greenbelt Center to only operate up to Greenbelt station at the request of the city of Greenbelt with service between Greenbelt station and Greenbelt Center being replaced by new routes G13, G14, and G16, in order to simplify Greenbelt bus service as much as possible with other routes and as a method of circumventing the transportation budget shortfall in Prince George's County, MD. Route C2 also discontinue the Beltway Plaza Loop as well being replaced by routes G14, and G16.

In 2015, WMATA proposed to split the C2 and C4 into two separate routes. Route C2 would operate between Greenbelt station and the upcoming Takoma Langley Crossroads Transit Center while route C4 would keep its current routing but have every other trip end at Wheaton station. Sunday service would also be added to route C2 in order to replace route 81 which is proposed to be eliminated. The changes were due to the demand for bus service is the lowest on the section of the line between Langley Park and Greenbelt  station and it is easier to manage service on University Boulevard with only one route instead of having overlapping service.

On March 27, 2016, new Sunday Service was added to the C2 operating between Greenbelt station and Langley Park only replacing route 81 service.

When the Takoma Langley Crossroads Transit Center opened on December 22, 2016, the C2 and C4 were rerouted, along with several other Metrobus, Ride On buses, Shuttle UM and TheBus routes, to serve the newly opened Transit Center. Routes C2 and C4 would serve Bus Bay A (Westbound) and Bus Bay D (Eastbound).

On December 17, 2017, Eastbound buses that departed Wheaton station were rerouted operate via Veirs Mill Road to access University Boulevard due to the closure of Reedie Drive. Eastbound service on Reedie Drive and Amherst Avenue will be eliminated.

During the COVID-19 pandemic, routes C2 and C4 began operating on its Saturday supplemental schedule beginning on March 16, 2020. However beginning on March 18, 2020, the route was further reduced to operate on its Sunday schedule during the weekdays with route C2 operating between Takoma Langley Crossroads and Greenbelt only having no service to Wheaton. Also, beginning on March 21, 2020, route C2 was suspended on the weekends while route C4 operating every 30 minutes on its full route. Regular weekday and weekend service resumed beginning on August 23, 2020.

Incidents
 On September 30, 2010, a C4 bus rear ended a C2 bus along University Boulevard. 26 people were injured in the collision.

References 

C2
Transportation in Montgomery County, Maryland
Transportation in Prince George's County, Maryland